Korolkov is a Russian male surname. Its feminine counterpart is Korolkova. Notable people with the surname include:

Anatoliy Korolkov, Russian sprint canoer 
Nikolai Korolkov (born 1946), Russian equestrian
Yevgeny Korolkov (1930–2014), Russian gymnast

Russian-language surnames